Palakodeti Sairam (born 24 January 1993) is an Indian cricketer. He made his first-class debut for Hyderabad in the 2017–18 Ranji Trophy on 25 November 2017. He made his List A debut for Hyderabad in the 2017–18 Vijay Hazare Trophy on 9 February 2018. He made his Twenty20 debut for Hyderabad in the 2018–19 Syed Mushtaq Ali Trophy on 22 February 2019.

References

External links
 

1993 births
Living people
Indian cricketers
Place of birth missing (living people)
Hyderabad cricketers